Admontia grandicornis is a species of fly in the family Tachinidae.

Distribution
Austria, Czech Republic, Denmark, Finland, France, Germany, Hungary, Italy, Netherlands, Norway, Poland, Russia, Slovakia, Sweden, Switzerland, U.K.

References

Insects described in 1849
Exoristinae
Diptera of Europe
Taxa named by Johan Wilhelm Zetterstedt